Sven Anders Gärderud (born 28 August 1946) is a Swedish former track and field athlete, winner of the 3000 m steeplechase event at the 1976 Summer Olympics in Montreal.

Gärderud was born to an orienteering competitor, and was an accomplished orienteer himself, winning a team gold medal at the 1977 Swedish Championships. He initially trained in orienteering and changed sports by chance – he was banned from running in the woods in autumn 1961 due to a jaundice epidemic and wandered into an athletic hall.

Gärderud experimented with several events before focusing on the 3000 m steeplechase. His first major competition were the 1968 Summer Olympics, where he was eliminated in the heats of 800 m and 1500 m. In the following years, Gärderud concentrated on the steeplechase, and was already a main favorite at the 1972 Summer Olympics, but, suffering from a cold, he was eliminated in his heat. Gärderud was also eliminated in the heats of the 5000 m at the Olympics, but only seven days later, he set a new 3000 m steeplechase world record at 8:20.8.

At the 1974 European Championships in Rome, Gärderud was beaten by Bronisław Malinowski of Poland, yet next year he broke the 3000 m steeplechase world record three times.

The culmination of Gärderud's career was at the 1976 Summer Olympics, where after a stirring contest with Malinowski and Frank Baumgartl, Gärderud won the gold medal in a new world record of 8:08.02. His victory in that event would earn him a share of the Svenska Dagbladet Gold Medal with cyclist Bernt Johansson.

After retiring from competitions Gärderud worked as a TV commentator of athletics events and as the head coach of the Swedish athletics team. In 1986 he married Annika Johansson.

Competition record

References

1946 births
Living people
Athletes from Stockholm
Swedish male middle-distance runners
Swedish male long-distance runners
Swedish male steeplechase runners
Olympic athletes of Sweden
Olympic gold medalists for Sweden

Athletes (track and field) at the 1968 Summer Olympics
Athletes (track and field) at the 1972 Summer Olympics
Athletes (track and field) at the 1976 Summer Olympics
European Athletics Championships medalists
World record setters in athletics (track and field)
Medalists at the 1976 Summer Olympics
Olympic gold medalists in athletics (track and field)